Goubert is a surname. Notable people with the surname include:

 Édouard Goubert (1894–1979), Indian mayor
 Joseph Goubert (1908–?), French field hockey player
 Pierre Goubert (1915–2012), French historian
 Stéphane Goubert (born 1970), French cyclist

See also
 Gobert